Wang Chucun (831–895) was a general of the Chinese Tang Dynasty, who controlled Yiwu Circuit (義武, headquartered in modern Baoding, Hebei) in late Tang. He was one of the main contributors in Tang's eventual defeat of the agrarian rebel Huang Chao.

Background 
Wang Chucun was born in 831, during the reign of Emperor Wenzong. His family was from the Tang Dynasty capital Chang'an, and his ancestors had served as officers in the imperial Shence Armies for generations. His father Wang Zong was not only a highly ranked general in the Shence armies but was also a skillful merchant. It was said that Wang Zong became so rich that he was able to be extravagant in his food and to have thousands of servants. Wang Chucun himself started his career as the commander at a Shence Army base, and he later became a general and a patrol commander. Yet later, he was made the overseer (制置使, Zizhishi) of the army at Ding Prefecture (定州, in modern Baoding, Hebei), then the capital of Yiwu Circuit.

As military governor of Yiwu Circuit

Before and during Huang Chao's rebellion 
In 879, Wang Chucun was made the military governor (Jiedushi) of Yiwu Circuit.

Around the new year 881, the major agrarian rebel Huang Chao captured Chang'an, forcing then-reigning Emperor Xizong to flee to Chengdu. Huang declared himself the emperor of a new state of Qi. Wang Chucun, upon hearing the news of Chang'an's fall, decided to head to Chang'an to aid the imperial cause even before Emperor Xizong sent any orders, and he also sent 2,000 men to Xingyuan (興元, in modern Hanzhong, Shaanxi), where Emperor Xizong was at the time en route to Chengdu, to protect the emperor.  He entered into an alliance with Wang Chongrong the military governor of Hezhong Circuit (河中, headquartered in modern Yuncheng, Shanxi), who had briefly submitted to Huang's Qi state but then reverted to Tang allegiance due to Huang's heavy tax and conscription burdens; they launched their armies and approached Chang'an, camping north of the Wei River.

By summer 881, several Tang generals had congregated near Chang'an, preparing to recapture it. These include, in addition to Wang Chucun and Wang Chongrong, Tang Hongfu, Cheng Zongchu, Tuoba Sigong, and Zheng Tian. Huang, fearful of the Tang forces, abandoned Chang'an and fled; during their flight, the Chang'an residents tried to aid the Tang forces by throwing rocks and bricks at Qi forces. Cheng, Wang Chucun, and Tang Hongfu entered the city to the celebration of the residents.  However, instead of comforting the residents, the soldiers began pillaging the city, and became bogged down with treasures they looted. The Qi forces, discovering this, counterattacked, and in the subsequent street battles, the Tang forces were crushed. Cheng and Tang Hongfu were killed, and Wang Chucun barely escaped. The Qi forces retook Chang'an and slaughtered the residents for their aiding of Tang forces during the battle.  The Tang forces were subsequently unable to launch another attack to recapture Chang'an for some time. Meanwhile, the Shatuo chieftain Li Keyong, who had previously rebelled against Tang rule as well, was offering to resubmit to the imperial government and aid in the operations against Huang but had also seized Xin and Dai (代州, both in modern Xinzhou, Shanxi) Prefectures and pillaged the surrounding regions. Wang Chucun's and Li Keyong's families had intermarried for generations and were friendly to each other, so Emperor Xizong had Wang Chucun write Li Keyong in fall 882, rebuking him for the pillages and instructing him to await instructions if he were truly interested in aiding the imperial government.

In 883, with Li Keyong arriving in Chang'an's vicinities, the Tang forces attacked Chang'an again, this time recapturing it for good. Huang fled east and would eventually be killed in 884. When the chancellor Wang Duo, who oversaw the operations against Huang, subsequently honored the generals with achievements during the campaign, Li Keyong was honored the most for his battlefield accomplishments, but Wang Chucun was honored the most for his quick reaction and loyalty to the emperor.

After Huang Chao's rebellion 
To reward him for his achievements, Li Keyong was made the military governor of Hedong Circuit (河東, headquartered in modern Taiyuan, Shanxi), and he subsequently used Hedong as his base to continually expand his power. Wang Chucun remained obedient to the imperial government, but was also allied with Li Keyong, taking a daughter of Li Keyong's to be the wife of his son Wang Ye. Wang Chucun's neighboring military governors Wang Rong the military governor of Chengde Circuit (成德, headquartered in modern Shijiazhuang, Hebei) and Li Keju the military governor of Lulong Circuit (盧龍, headquartered in modern Beijing), however, feared Li Keyong's expansion and alliance with Wang Chucun, and therefore decided to destroy Wang Chucun and divide Yiwu among themselves. In spring 885, they launched the attack, and persuaded Helian Duo the military governor of Datong Circuit (大同, headquartered in modern Datong, Shanxi) to attack Li Keyong to stop him from coming to Wang Chucun's aid.

Helian's attack, however, did not stop Li Keyong from coming to Wang Chucun's aid, and he repelled the Chengde attack. Meanwhile, though, Li Keju's general Li Quanzhong captured one of Yiwu's two prefectures, Yi Prefecture (易州, in modern Baoding). The Lulong forces, however, became arrogant after they captured Yi Prefecture.  Wang Chucun sent 3,000 soldiers disguised as sheep (by wearing sheepskin) and had them come out at night. The Lulong soldiers thought that they were in fact sheep and came out to pillage them.  Wang Chucun then surprised them with his attack, defeating them and recapturing Yi Prefecture, forcing Li Quanzhong to flee. (Li Quanzhong, fearing punishment from Li Keju, subsequently mutinied and attacked Li Keju, forcing Li Keju to commit suicide. Li Quanzhong then took over Lulong.)

Around the same time, though, Wang Chongrong and the powerful eunuch Tian Lingzi, who dominated Emperor Xizong's court (which had returned to Chang'an by this point), got into a major dispute over control of salt ponds at Hezhong Circuit. Tian tried to retaliate against Wang Chongrong by having Emperor Xizong issue an edict transferring Wang Chongrong to Taining Circuit (泰寧, in modern Jining, Shandong), Qi Kerang the military governor of Taining to Yiwu, and Wang Chucun to Hezhong. Wang Chucun submitted an objection, pointing out that the Lulong/Chengde attack had just recently been repelled and that he should not leave Yiwu at that time, and further defending Wang Chongrong, arguing that Wang Chongrong had great accomplishments against Huang and should not be transferred easily.  Tian ignored Wang Chucun's objections and ordered him to report to Hezhong.  Wang Chucun made a token attempt to do so, advancing to Jin Prefecture (晉州, in modern Linfen, Shanxi), but after meeting resistance from Wang Chongrong's subordinate, Ji Junwu the prefect of Jin, he returned to Yiwu. He appeared to make no subsequently attempt to side with either side when Wang Chongrong and Li Keyong subsequently engaged and defeated the forces under Tian and his allies Zhu Mei the military governor of Jingnan Circuit (靜難, headquartered in modern Xianyang, Shaanxi) and Li Changfu the military governor of Fengxiang Circuit (鳳翔, headquartered in modern Baoji, Shaanxi), causing Emperor Xizong to flee again, to Xingyuan, nor was there any sign that he was involved in Zhu's subsequent failed attempt to make Emperor Xizong's distant relative Li Yun the Prince of Xiang emperor.

In 892, Li Keyong and Wang Chucun attacked Wang Rong, but were repelled.

In 895, Wang Chucun died. The soldiers supported his son Wang Gao to succeed him. Then-reigning Emperor Zhaozong (Emperor Xizong's brother) gave him the posthumous name of Zhongsu (忠肅, "faithful and solemn").

References 

 Old Book of Tang, vol. 182.
 New Book of Tang, vol. 186.
 Zizhi Tongjian, vols. 253, 254, 255, 256, 259, 260.

831 births
895 deaths
Tang dynasty jiedushi of Yiwu Circuit
Tang dynasty jiedushi of Hezhong Circuit
Politicians from Xi'an
Tang dynasty generals from Shaanxi
Tang dynasty politicians from Shaanxi